Smoak is a surname.  Notable people with the name include:

Gerald C. Smoak (1930–2018), American politician
Jim Smoak (born 1934), American bluegrass and country music banjo player
John Richard Smoak Jr. (born 1943), American judge
Justin Smoak (born 1986), American baseball player
Marion Hartzog Smoak (1916–2020), American attorney and politician

Fictional characters
Felicity Smoak, DC Comics character
Felicity Smoak (Arrowverse) character from The CW's Arrowverse franchise

See also
Smoke (surname)